Vathana is a Cambodian and Laotian name. Notable people with the name include:

 Vathana Keodouangdeth (born 1996), Laotian footballer
 Ang Vong Vathana, Cambodian minister of justice

Cambodian culture
Laotian culture